The Portuguese Albums Chart ranks the best-performing albums in Portugal, as compiled by the Associação Fonográfica Portuguesa.

References 

Albums 2003
2003 in Portugal
Portugal albums